This is a list of notable popcorn brands. Popcorn, also known as popping corn, is a type of corn (maize, Zea mays var. everta) that expands from the kernel and puffs up when heated. Popcorn is able to pop because its kernels have a hard moisture-sealed hull and a dense starchy interior. Pressure builds inside the kernel, and a small explosion (or "pop") is the end result. Some strains of corn are now cultivated specifically as popping corns.

Microwave popcorn is unpopped popcorn in an enhanced, sealed paper bag intended to be heated in a microwave oven. In addition to the dried corn the bags typically contain solidified cooking oil, one or more seasonings (often salt), and natural or artificial flavorings, or both. With the many different flavors, there are many different manufacturers.

Notable popcorn brands

See also

List of brand name snack foods
List of confectionery brands
List of chocolate-covered foods
List of American desserts

References

External links
 

 
List of popcorn brands
Popcorn